The 1947 All England Championships was a badminton tournament held at the Harringay Arena, London, England, from 5–9 March 1947. Snow made its way into the arena during the first round and made the courts unplayable.

Final results

Men's singles

Women's singles

References

All England Open Badminton Championships
All England Badminton Championships
All England Open Badminton Championships in London
All England Championships
All England Badminton Championships
All England Badminton Championships